Jim Washburn (born December 2, 1949) is an American football coach. He was the assistant defensive line coach for the Detroit Lions from 2013 to 2015, defensive line coach for the Philadelphia Eagles of the National Football League and the Tennessee Titans' defensive line coach from 1999 to 2010.

Coaching career
Washburn was hired by the Tennessee Titans as their defensive line coach in 1999. During his 12-year tenure with the Titans, the team ranked seventh in sacks with 474 and fifth in run defense thanks to Washburn's defensive line.

Washburn agreed to a three-year contract as the Philadelphia Eagles' defensive line coach on January 19, 2011.  Washburn was fired by the Eagles on December 3, 2012 following a Sunday night loss to the Dallas Cowboys that extended the team's 2012 losing streak to eight games.

On January 22, 2013, Washburn was hired by the Detroit Lions as a defensive assistant. His son, Jeremiah, was the offensive line coach for the Lions until 2015.

Steroid scandal
While coaching at the University of South Carolina, Washburn was embroiled in a steroid scandal that resulted in his (and three other assistant coaches) indictment.  Washburn pled guilty, and was sentenced to three months in a halfway house and given a three-year probationary term.

References

1949 births
Living people
Arkansas Razorbacks football coaches
Detroit Lions coaches
Houston Cougars football coaches
Lees–McRae Bobcats football coaches
London Monarchs coaches
Miami Dolphins coaches
New Mexico Lobos football coaches
Philadelphia Eagles coaches
SMU Mustangs football coaches
South Carolina Gamecocks football coaches
Tennessee Titans coaches
West Alabama Tigers football coaches
Charlotte Rage coaches
People from Shelby, North Carolina